The 1975 Scottish Cup Final was played on 3 May 1975 at Hampden Park in Glasgow and was the 90th final of the Scottish Cup. Celtic and Airdrieonians contested the match: Celtic won the match 3–1 with goals from Paul Wilson (two) and a Pat McCluskey penalty; Kevin McCann scoring Airdrieonians’ goal.

The game was Celtic's seventh successive appearance in the final, it was also Celtic's 25th Scottish Cup. Airdrieonians played in their second Scottish Cup final, 51 years after they won the cup.

After the match, Celtic captain Billy McNeill announced his retirement.

Match details

Teams

External links
SFA report

References

1975
Cup Final
Scottish Cup Final 1975
Scottish Cup Final 1975
1970s in Glasgow
May 1975 sports events in the United Kingdom